The 2010 Marrakech Formula Two round was the second round of the 2010 FIA Formula Two Championship season. It was held on May 1, 2010 and May 2, 2010 at the Marrakech Street Circuit, Morocco.

Classification

Qualifying 1

Qualifying 2

Race 1

Race 2

Standings after the race 
Drivers' Championship standings

References

FIA Formula Two Championship